Count of Vannes was the title held by the rulers of the County of Vannes.

History

Gwened

Bretons held the hinterland around Vannes as early as Waroch in the early 6th century. He and his successors established a petty kingdom in the area. His son Canao began killing his brothers rather than divide the patrimony, but his brother Macliau, the bishop of Gwened, not only escaped but successfully annexed neighboring Cornouaille from an underage ruler who had been left in his care. St Judicaël successfully unified the Breton states in the early 7th century, but they split once again and were not reunified until Nominoë in the 9th century.

Brittany

Nominoë was certainly titled count of Vannes, appearing as such on two charters. It is uncertain when he was raised to the office, however: it may have been as early as 819 or as late as 834. His son and successor Erispoë seems to have used the area as a similar base but, after his assassination by his cousin Salomon, the county went to a Ridoredh. A prominent landowner in the area, he was succeeded by his elder son Pascweten and his younger son Alan eventually rose to become King of Brittany. Upon Alan's death, Brittany was overrun by several Viking raiding parties. The Countship of Vannes was interrupted from either 907 or 919 to approximately 937 when Alan the Fox returned to Brittany. Alan the Fox had been in exile in England. Defeating the Vikings at the 939 Battle of Trans-la-Forêt, he reasserted himself both as Count of Vannes and Duke of Brittany. At this point, the title was effectively merged with that of the Duke of Brittany. After the death of the childless Drogo, the Counts of Rennes ceased to use the title. It was effectively merged to the crown of France and thus extinguished under the Third Republic.

List

Waroch I? ( )
Canao I? ( ), his son
...
Waroch II? ( ), invaded by the French twice
...
Judicaël? ( ), king of Domnonia and high king of Brittany
...
King Morman? ( 818), invaded by the French
...
Wihomarc? ( 825) 
...
Duke Nominoë ( 835 – 851) 
King Erispoë (851–857), his son
...
Count Ridoredh, an unrelated landowner
Count Pascweten, his son
King Alan the Great (877–907?), his brother
Count Rudalt ( 907?–919?), his son, fled before the Vikings
 ...
Duke Alan the Fox (938–952), son of Alan I's daughter and the Count of Poher
Duke Drogo (952–958), his son

Notes

References
Vannes
Medieval Brittany